Ruslan Otverchenko (6 January 1990 – 15 January 2023) was a Ukrainian basketball player for SC Prometey and the Ukrainian National Team.

Otverchenko played the majority of his career in Ukraine, with exception of one season in Spain with Bàsquet Manresa. He participated at the EuroBasket 2017.

Otverchenko died from heart complications in Kyiv on 15 January 2023, at the age of 33.

References

1990 births
2023 deaths
Bàsquet Manresa players
BC Budivelnyk players
BC Cherkaski Mavpy players
BC Donetsk players
BC Kyiv players
BC Prometey players
Kyiv-Basket players
Liga ACB players
Shooting guards
Sportspeople from Ulaanbaatar
Ukrainian expatriate basketball people in Spain
Ukrainian men's basketball players